William "Will" Smith (portrayed by Willard "Will" Smith) is a fictionalized version of Smith and main character in the 1990–1996 NBC television sitcom The Fresh Prince of Bel-Air and the 2022 Peacock streaming television drama Bel-Air, portrayed in the latter series by Jabari Banks.

Concept and characteristics
The character of Will Smith is loosely based on the life of Warner Bros. executive Benny Medina as well as the actor who plays him of the same name (although in the show 'Will' is short for William, while in real life it is short for Willard). Smith's charming and mischievous personality earned him the nickname "Prince," which eventually became "Fresh Prince". Smith had become a successful rapper, but lost most of his money because of poor budgeting. When NBC signed Smith up for the sitcom, he was almost bankrupt, and it immediately launched his acting career.

Background
The premise of the character of Will, and of the show in general, is outlined in the opening theme. Will is a street-smart and laid-back West Philadelphia teenager. While playing street basketball, Will misses a shot and the ball hits a group of gang members. After hearing about the subsequent fight with them he got into, his mother sends him to live with his wealthy aunt and uncle (Vivian and Phillip Banks) in Bel-Air.

Storyline
Following Will's arrival in Bel-Air, he was a great distance from home and was considered an outsider by many people in his Bel-Air neighborhood. Early on, he had a picture of Malcolm X on his wall. He often disagrees with his cousin Carlton, whom he sees as not quite "black" enough because he doesn't talk like other young African Americans. The next day at school, Carlton and Will show up and after failing to talk the bully down and scare her, they bribe her to leave Ashley alone for $50. Will becomes sick with an infection and must have his tonsils removed. At the hospital, Will befriend his roommate, an elderly patient named Max Jakey who has an optimistic and care-free attitude despite being cooped up in a hospital all the time. After suffering from nightmares about incompetent doctors, Will escapes and goes back home but is busted by Uncle Phil and Aunt Viv when Phil sits on top of Geoffrey's bed. Will is taken back to the hospital (complete with a bodyguard to prevent his escape) and has his surgery. Max later returns to retrieve his lucky hat, having been moved to Cedars-Sinai Hospital. Talking to Will and seeing a nurse come in, he gives Will his lucky hat to keep. While Smith sometimes perceives Phil as being overprotective of Ashley, he himself also can be; when Ashley asks him about sex, Will became shocked by Ashley's inquiry, which leads him and Carlton to go to a clinic to talk to a doctor about how to discuss sex with Ashley. Will and Carlton are punished for their behavior and ordered by Uncle Phil to get the bracelet back. At the pawn shop, Agnes is about to sell the bracelet to another customer for $550. Playing on the crush Agnes has on Carlton, he plans to have Carlton strip to get the bracelet. His father, Lou, who had abandoned him at childhood, returns in the episode "Papa's Got A Brand New Excuse." His dad promises to take him on the road with him, but later drops Will, and the resulting disappointment breaks Will’s heart. It is then that Smith tearfully realizes Philip is the closest thing he had to a father. Will and the Banks family vacation to Will's hometown in Philadelphia, Pennsylvania where Will learns to his horror that he has a reputation as a chicken due to not fighting Omar, a local bully and instead going to live in Bel Air, Los Angeles. To salvage his reputation, Will plans to fight Omar on the basketball court where he had the notorious fight but finds that Omar is no longer a bully and has grown up, attempting to give back to his community and help people. Will refuses to take no for an answer and keeps trying to fight Omar, who reminds Will that he needs to grow up and stop worrying about his reputation. Will chooses to stay home an extra week with Vy but later calls Uncle Phil to tell him that he's not coming back. 

Though Will often teases his Uncle Phillip due to his obesity, he genuinely values Phillip as a father figure and fiercely defends him when his image or integrity is attacked by outsiders, especially in season 3's "Asses to Ashes." In the episode, "Bullets Over Bel-Air," Will is shot at a bank ATM while protecting Carlton from a robber. Carlton then feels that Will could have died saving him. During one of Will's visits back to his old neighborhood in Philly, he confronts the old park thug, Omar, to restore his damaged reputation. When Will challenges him, he is startled when a reformed Omar refuses to fight back. Omar shuns Will, and through him, Will gradually realizes that his reputation is not important.

Similar to his relationship with Uncle Phil is his relationship with his cousin Carlton. Though he often mocks Carlton mercilessly over his preppy nature, lack of “street cred”, and generally uncool nature, he is also fiercely protective of Carlton and will not hesitate to come to his cousin's defense. As stated previously, he even went so far as to take a bullet for Carlton. In another episode, Will quits a black fraternity when they refuse to let Carlton in for not being “black” enough. Will’s loyalty and love for Carlton are not lost on the latter, and in the final episode Carlton outright tells Will “Thank you for being the brother I always wanted.”.

At the conclusion of the show's run, the Banks family decides to settle in New York, while Will remains in Los Angeles to finish his last year of college. Will eventually becomes a close member of the Banks family and a better man by the series' end. Will delivers the last line of dialogue in the series: "I am definitely going to miss you, C."

Reception
The character and Will Smith's portrayal received near unanimous praise from television critics and audiences alike. UGO editor Bryan Enk praised Will Smith's role as the character, stating "Rarely has there been a television series so perfectly tailor-made for its star than The Fresh Prince of Bel-Air [...] Fresh Prince fit Will Smith like a glove; it was obviously a showcase for him, but his co-stars were just as good, and Smith never hogged the spotlight (or the camera), allowing each cast member to shine in every episode."

References 

Author surrogates
Fictional African-American people
Fictional characters from Philadelphia
Fictional characters who break the fourth wall
Television characters introduced in 1990
Cultural depictions of hip hop musicians
Cultural depictions of actors
American male characters in television
American sitcom television characters
The Fresh Prince of Bel-Air
Teenage characters in television
Will Smith